Samuel J. LeFrak (February 12, 1918 – April 16, 2003) was an American real estate tycoon. He was a noted landlord who chaired a private building firm, the LeFrak Organization, which was ranked 45th on the Forbes list of top 500 private companies.  The development firm is best known for major development projects in Battery Park City; LeFrak City in Queens; and Newport, Jersey City. Although the LeFrak organization claims it was founded in 1883 in France, by Samuel J. LeFrak's grandfather, Maurice, passenger arrival index (ref. 4) indicates his grandfather was Aron Lefrak from Slutsk. Extended family in the 1940s to 1960s knew that Harry Lefrak and family were from Slutsk, and the family never used the spelling "LeFrak". (Personal communication from Lilly Feingold Mogil, niece of Harry Lefrak's wife Sarah Schwartz.)

Biography
LeFrak was born in Manhattan, New York, to Harry (Harris) Lefrak and the former Sarah Schwartz, who had originated in Slutsk, near Minsk, in Belarus (then Russia). He grew up in Brooklyn, New York, and attended Erasmus Hall High School in Flatbush, Brooklyn. He graduated from the University of Maryland, College Park, in 1940, with the University's LeFrak Hall named for him.  While at Maryland, he was a brother in the Tau Epsilon Phi fraternity.

In the early 1970s he was sued by the federal government for housing discrimination; the case was resolved in a January 1971 agreement.

In 1975, he co-founded a small recording and publishing company, The Entertainment Company, with his then son-in-law Martin Bandier and Charles Koppelman. The company recorded "Groovin'" by the Rascals, "Here You Come Again" by Dolly Parton, "My Heart Belongs to Me" by Barbra Streisand, Streisand and Donna Summer's duet, "No More Tears (Enough Is Enough)", "By The Time I Get to Phoenix" by Glen Campbell, "Why Do Fools Fall in Love" by Diana Ross, "Love Will Keep Us Together" by the Captain & Tennille, and the soundtrack album to the television series Fame. In 1984, the relationship was dissolved after Bandier divorced LeFrak's daughter.

In 1988, LeFrak was honored by the United Nations, along with former President Jimmy Carter, for global contributions through Habitat International. After his death, his son, Richard LeFrak, became CEO of the LeFrak Organization.

Personal life
In 1941, LeFrak married Ethel Stone. They had four children:
Denise LeFrak Calicchio, philanthropist formerly married to music industry executive Martin Bandier and the inspiration for the 1963 doo-wop hit "Denise".
Richard LeFrak
Francine LeFrak Friedberg 
Jacqueline LeFrak Kosinski

LeFrak died at the age of 85 on April 16, 2003. Funeral services were held at Congregation Emanu-El in New York City.

References

External links
 The LeFrak Organization
 

1918 births
2003 deaths
American real estate businesspeople
Businesspeople from New York City
Erasmus Hall High School alumni
Jewish American philanthropists
Tau Epsilon Phi
LeFrak family
People from Brooklyn
University of Maryland, College Park alumni
Philanthropists from New York (state)
American landlords